Utricularia geminiloba is a medium-sized perennial lithophyte or terrestrial carnivorous plant that belongs to the genus Utricularia. U. geminiloba is endemic to Brazil. It was originally published and described by Ludwig Benjamin in 1847. The species epithet refers to the two pronounced anterior corolla lobes ("Gemini lobes").

See also 
 List of Utricularia species

References 

Carnivorous plants of South America
Flora of Brazil
geminiloba